The King's School is a coeducational secondary school with academy status, located in Pontefract, West Yorkshire, England. It is one of the four oldest schools in Yorkshire, dating from 1139 and was refounded by King Edward VI in 1548.

History
King's School Pontefract was founded in 1139. Little documentation survives from its early years, and it was refounded in the reign of King Edward VI. It has been associated with the Duchy of Lancaster since 1588 when it was given an endowment to allow it to continue functioning. In 1792 it was refounded yet again by George III who is the eponymous king. Annual payments of £50 were made by the Duchy of Lancaster until 1869. It closed in the 1880s but reopened on 4 May 1890 and has continued to the present day, although it was relocated in 1932.

Grammar school
The present buildings were opened on 14 July 1932 by Sir F. Stanley Jackson. It was a boys' grammar school with around 650 boys, operated by the West Riding County Council. Four houses were formed, each associated with a name and a colour. They were Atkinson (yellow), Lyon (blue), De Lacy (green) and King Edward (red). Classes corresponding to years were numbered from 1 to 5 with three streamed classes in each year from and including Form 2. Upon entry to the school boys were placed in classes 1A, 1B and 1C ordered by surname alphabetically. In the second form streaming started with the top 30 rated pupils being placed in 2R (R for Rapid as year 3 was skipped by these pupils, passing directly to 4R). The other classes in the second form were 2A, 2B, 2C based on academic level. Thereafter the classes were for example in the 5th form: 5R, 5A, 5B. All pupils had a form master and went to classes with specialist Teachers. There were not enough rooms for all classes to have a form room - some of the upper sixth form used to have the corridor outside the dining room as their form room. Only a few pupils stayed on for the sixth form, many pupils left the school at 16. It was expected that the R-class pupils would go on to the sixth form. The Grammar school had a tradition of playing Rugby Union and there were fields outside for this purpose, which were converted for cricket in the summer.

Comprehensive
The school became a comprehensive with a sixth form in 1978. Pontefract Girls' High School, the girls' grammar school became New College, Pontefract, and 11-18 school. In 1987, Pontefract schools lost their sixth form, with a sixth form college being established at NEW College, Pontefract.

Academy
The school converted to academy status on 1 April 2013 and is one of two high schools with Carleton High School in Pontefract Academies Trust.

Headmasters
The following have been headmasters:
 1548 John Stagg
1585 Lyonell Naylor
1593 John Marshe
1593 William Hartley
1622 Arthur Bromeley
1622 Thurston Elliott
1654 Thomas Lake
1662 Thomas Hunt 
1672 Joseph Swift
1685 Nathan Drake
1689 Thomas Atkinson
1697 Thomas Horwood
1705 Thomas Horwood
1713 Francis Lassells
1737 Richard Harrison
1742 William Holmes
1778 Miles Steadman
1793 James Bindloss
1806 James Dixon
1807 Archibold C Campbell
1822 Pattison Watman
1851 Samuel W Newbald
1869 Thomas Longley
1874 Henry Caukwell
1889 Thomas H Nichols
1918 Edward B Forrest
1939 John D Lean (Died late 1958)
1959 Alan Aldous 
1970 J. Gavin Peck
1977 Mrs Joyce Grace (nee Pickersgill)
1985 V.S Kenningham
2000 Julie Craig
2013 Barbara Tibbets
2018 Elaine Briggs
2019 Dominic Pinto

Admissions
The school is currently situated on a raised area near Ackworth Road in Pontefract, along Mill Hill Lane, southwest of the town centre and the A645/A639 crossroads. There are over 1,000 pupils, 60 teaching staff and 53 additional staff. The school's current Headteacher is Mr Dominic Pinto. The King's School, Carleton High School and many of the Primary Schools in the two pyramids are now members of Pontefract Academies Trust (previously, Pontefract Education Trust)

Sport
The school's sporting traditions include rugby union (the year 11 team reached the final of the Yorkshire Cup in 2006), and athletics, with some pupils achieving local and national honours.

Notable former pupils
 Derek Birdsall, graphic designer, who redesigned the Book of Common Prayer in 2000
 Ken Booth, E. H. Carr Professor of International Politics from 1999 to 2008 at Aberystwyth University
 Michael Eaton, former chief spokesman of the National Coal Board during the miners' strike
 Scott Grant KCB, Chief Royal Engineer from 1999 to 2004, Quartermaster-General to the Forces from 1998 to 2000, and Colonel Commandant from 1997 to 2004 of the Royal Engineers
 Henry John Poskitt, Roman Catholic Bishop of Leeds from 1936 to 1950
 Rich Johnston, cartoonist, writer and journalist
 Simon Thorp, Viz cartoonist
 Peter Townend, former social editor of Tatler
 Nick Revell, stand-up comedian and scriptwriter*

References

Secondary schools in the City of Wakefield
1139 establishments in England
Educational institutions established in the 12th century
Defunct grammar schools in England
Pontefract
Academies in the City of Wakefield